Salvia viscosa is a herbaceous perennial native to a small area of mountains in Lebanon and Israel. It was first described in 1781 by Nikolaus Joseph von Jacquin but only began being sold in nurseries in the 1990s.

Salvia viscosa grows a small cluster of leaves from which  inflorescences arise in midsummer. The plant seeds profusely.

Notes

viscosa
Flora of Israel
Flora of Lebanon
Flora of Palestine (region)
Plants described in 1781